The 2013 Trofeo Stefano Bellaveglia was a professional tennis tournament played on clay courts. It was the fifth edition of the tournament which was part of the 2013 ATP Challenger Tour. It took place in Orbetello, Italy between 22 and 28 July 2013.

Singles main draw entrants

Seeds

 1 Rankings are as of July 15, 2013.

Other entrants
The following players received wildcards into the singles main draw:
  Enrico Burzi
  Daniele Giorgini
  Adelchi Virgili
  Filippo Volandri

The following players received entry from the qualifying draw:
  Guillermo Durán
  Reda El Amrani
  Libor Salaba
  Denis Zivkovic

Champions

Singles

 Filippo Volandri vs.  Pere Riba 6–4, 7–6(9–7)

Doubles

 Marco Crugnola /  Simone Vagnozzi def.  Guillermo Durán /  Renzo Olivo 7–6(7–3), 6–7(5–7), [10–6]

External links
Official website

Trofeo Stefano Bellaveglia
Trofeo Stefano Bellaveglia